Morandi is an Italian surname, which is derived from the given name Morando. The surname may refer to:

Aldo Morandi (1896–1975), Italian political activist
Anna Morandi Manzolini (1714–1774), Italian anatomist
Giacomo Morandi (born 1965), Italian prelate, official of the Roman Curia 
Gianni Morandi (born 1944), Italian singer
Giorgio Morandi (1890–1964), Italian painter
Giovanni Maria Morandi (1622–1717), Italian painter
Giovanni Morandi (composer) (1777–1856), Italian composer
Leo Morandi (1923–2009), Italian businessman
Matteo Morandi (born 1981), Italian gymnast
Pier Giorgio Morandi (born 1958), Italian oboist and conductor
Riccardo Morandi (1902–1989), Italian civil engineer
Rodolfo Morandi (1902–1955), Italian politician
Santiago Morandi (born 1984), Uruguayan football player

Other uses
Morandi (band), a Romanian music group
Ponte Morandi, the collapsed Morandi Bridge in Genoa, Italy

References

Italian-language surnames